Chittenipattu Puthenveettil Rajendran, (born 29 May 1955) also known among his peers as CP, is an Indian geologist who has worked mainly on the Indian earthquakes and tectonics.

Education
Rajendran did his schooling in Thiruvananthapuram (Trivandrum) and Chennai and did his BSc (1976) in Geology from University College, Kerala University and MSc (1978) from Cochin University of Science and Technology. He joined Centre for Earth Science Studies as a research scientist. After obtaining PhD from the Cochin University of Science and Technology in 1988, he moved to the University of South Carolina (USA) for postdoctoral studies, till 1993.

Profession
CP moved back to Centre for Earth Science Studies, Trivandrum in 1994 where he continued till 2008. He accepted Ramanujan National Fellowship by the Government of India at the Indian Institute of Science in 2009 and now works at the new centre initiated on Earth Science there. He is married to Prof. Kusala Rajendran, currently in the faculty at the Indian Institute of Science, Bangalore.

Dr. Rajendran is one of India's foremost expert in paleoseismology. He has contributed to the development of this field for the last three decades by his research contributions in seismo-tectonics, earthquake geology, paleoseismology, and tsunami geology in India. His efforts have provided insights into the earthquake recurrence and fault zone deformation in various seismotectonic provinces of India.

He initiated paleoseismological work at various parts of the country including Killari (Latur), Kerala, Rann of Kachchh, Saurashtra, Cambay, Panvel (Maharashtra), Assam, Central Himalaya and Andaman-Nicobar region. His work prior to 2001 Gujarat earthquake on the 1819 Rann of Kutch earthquake and the linear elevated tract of land called "Allahbund" in the low-lying Rann in the northwest India has led to basic understanding on earthquake processes in the north western part of India.

His search in the epicentral area of the 1819 Rann of Kutch earthquake led to the identification of another event between 800 and 1,000 years B.P. Based on the relative size and frequency of 2001 and older sandblows, he interpreted that the earlier earthquake may have also originated from the same source.

CP was ranked among the top ten young researchers in the country by the "Outlook" Magazine (dated 18 July 2005).

He is able to make original scientific contributions to earthquake studies and seismic hazard in India. Recent years he has also been working on the tsunami geology and hazard and worked in many globally important locations like the Chilean Coast and Makran Coast in Iran. He is also involved in the collaborative work and co-operation on tsunami hazard, among various researchers from many countries. He also writes articles for science popularisation.

Dr. Rajendran has served as a 
 Member, Research Advisory Committee, Wadia Institute of Himalayan Geology, Govt. of India [2004–2006].
 Member, Council of the Geological Society of India [2004–2007]
 Member, Project Advisory and Management Committee on National Seismicity Programme, Dept. of Science and Technology, Govt. of India, New Delhi, [1998– 2002].
 Member, Natural Disaster Management Plan for the Kerala State, Science and Technology, and Environment Council, Government of Kerala (2005).
 Member, Expert Committee, Government of Kerala, Stability of Mullaperiyar dam in the light of recent earthquakes (2000–2001)

Awards
He was awarded the National Geoscience Award in 2009 by the Government of India for his contributions in the field of disaster management.

References

External links
 Dr. C.P. Rajendran CEAS IISC homepage
 On Sethusamudram Project
 CP on ancient canal and stone quarries near Halebidu, Hassan District,
 Call for studies on reservoir-induced seismicity in Idukki
 On Mullaperiyar in Malayalam

Indian seismologists
Living people
People from Ottapalam
1955 births
University of Kerala alumni
20th-century Indian earth scientists
University of South Carolina alumni
Scientists from Kerala